The 1972 Stanley Cup Finals was the championship series of the National Hockey League's (NHL) 1971–72 season, and the culmination of the 1972 Stanley Cup playoffs. It was contested between the Boston Bruins and the New York Rangers. It was the Rangers' first appearance in the finals since 1950. The Bruins were making their first appearance since their victory in the 1970 Finals. It was the second Boston-New York Final series, the other being the 1929 Finals. The Bruins won the best-of-seven series, four games to two.

This was only the second Stanley Cup Final contested by New York in which the Rangers hosted all of their home games. The first such Final, held in 1929, had lasted only two games. All other previous Finals contested by the Rangers had partly or entirely coincided with an annual circus formerly held at Madison Square Garden, compelling the Rangers to play Finals games at neutral sites and/or at the venues of their opponents.

Paths to the Finals
Boston defeated the Toronto Maple Leafs 4–1 and the St. Louis Blues 4–0 to advance to the final.

New York defeated the defending champion Montreal Canadiens 4–2 and the Chicago Black Hawks 4–0 to set up an "Original Six" final.

Game summaries
Bobby Orr, who tallied 4 goals and 4 assists in the series, won the Conn Smythe Trophy for the second time. It was also Orr's second Cup-clinching goal, having accomplished both feats in the 1970 finals. Phil Esposito had 41 shots in the series but was held without a goal.

Game one

Game one in Boston saw both teams play poorly. The Bruins at one point led 5–1 as Ken Hodge completed a hat trick, and Hodge and Derek Sanderson scored short-handed goals on the same Ranger power play at the end of the first period. However, the Rangers tied the game with goals from Gilbert, Hatfield, Tkaczuk, and Bruce MacGregor. With 2:16 remaining in the third period, Garnet "Ace" Bailey beat Rangers star defenseman Brad Park to have the Bruins prevail 6–5.

Gary Doak of the Rangers was ejected from the game after a heated argument with referee Bill Friday over a penalty he received at 18:50 of the first period.

Game two

Game two had Gilles Villemure replace Ed Giacomin in goal for the Rangers. He played well, but the Bruins did too and won 2–1.

Game three

In New York, Giacomin was back in goal for game three as the Rangers won 5–2. Brad Park opened the scoring with a power play goal and scored another in the first period. Rod Gilbert also had two goals in the game.

Game four

Giacomin was having trouble with a knee he injured during the Chicago series and lost game four 3–2.

Game five

Game five in Boston had Villemure again replace Giacomin. Boston led 2–1 after two periods. However, Bobby Rousseau scored twice in the third period, his second at 12:45 turned out to be the winner in a 3–2 win for the Rangers.

Game six

Game six in New York saw Boston play flawlessly and Gerry Cheevers picked up a shutout, 3–0. Bobby Orr's first-period marker ended up standing as the Stanley Cup-winning goal, and he also assisted on the Bruins' second goal. Orr spent 10 minutes in the penalty box after arguing with referee Art Skov but upon his return on the ice played a crucial role in killing off a penalty to the Bruins. Wayne Cashman scored two goals, one of which trickled in behind Gilles Villemure.

As of 2022, the 1972 Bruins are the most recent team to have won the Cup without a formal captain. John Bucyk, as the team's senior assistant captain, accepted the Cup and circled the rink in the ceremonial skate.

Broadcasting
Hockey Night in Canada moved all playoff coverage from CBC to CTV (in actuality, MacLaren Advertising, the actual rights holders of HNIC at the time, worked out arrangements with CTV to move the full NHL playoffs there) to avoid conflict with the lengthy NABET strike against the CBC.

In the United States, CBS took a rather calculated risk in not televising the game five match on May 9 (CBS aired regular programming, including the original Hawaii Five-O in that time period on that Tuesday night). This was despite the fact that game five was a potential clincher with the Bruins up three games to one on the Rangers. CBS ultimately lucked out (since the Rangers won game five 3-2), and televised the clincher (game six) on Thursday night, May 11.

Stanley Cup engraving

The following Bruins players and staff had their names engraved on the Stanley Cup:

1971–72 Boston Bruins

See also
 1971–72 Boston Bruins season
 1971–72 NHL season
 1971–72 New York Rangers season

Notes

References
 
 

Stanley Cup
Stanley Cup Finals
Boston Bruins games
New York Rangers games
Ice hockey competitions in Boston
Ice hockey competitions in New York City
Stanley Cup Finals
Stanley Cup Finals
Stanley Cup Finals
Stanley Cup Finals
Stanley Cup Finals
1970s in Manhattan
Boston Garden
Madison Square Garden